Vannarpannai Vaitheeswaran Temple is a Hindu temple in Vannarpannai, Jaffna in northern Sri Lanka. It was built by Vaithilingam Chettiar a business man  during the Dutch colonial period. The temple was declared an archaeological protected monument in December 2011.

References

External links

Hindu temples in Jaffna District
Religious buildings and structures in Jaffna
Siva temples in Sri Lanka
Archaeological protected monuments in Jaffna District